National Collegiate Athletic Association (NCAA) Football Bowl Subdivision independent schools are four-year institutions whose football programs are not part of an NCAA-affiliated conference. This means that FBS independents are not required to schedule each other for competition like conference schools do.

There are fewer independent schools than in years past; many independent schools join, or attempt to join, established conferences. The main reasons to join a conference are to gain a share of television revenue and access to bowl games that agree to take teams from certain conferences, and to help deal with otherwise potentially difficult challenges in scheduling opponents to play throughout the season.

All Division I FBS independents are eligible for the College Football Playoff (CFP), or for the so-called "access bowls" (the New Year's Six bowls that issue at-large bids: Cotton, Peach, and Fiesta), if they are chosen by the CFP selection committee. Army has an agreement with the Independence Bowl. Notre Dame has a potential tie-in with the Orange Bowl, along with other bowls via its affiliation with the Atlantic Coast Conference (ACC). Historically, Notre Dame had similar agreements with its previous conference, the Big East.

The ranks of football independents increased by one starting with the 2011 season with the announcement that BYU would leave the Mountain West Conference (MW) to become a football independent starting with that season. The ranks increased by two in 2013 when the Western Athletic Conference (WAC) dropped football and New Mexico State and Idaho did not have a conference for football. The ranks of football independents decreased by two in 2014 with the return of Idaho and New Mexico State as football-only members of the Sun Belt Conference (SBC) and decreased by one more in 2015 with Navy joining the American Athletic Conference (AAC) as a football-only member. UMass became an FBS independent in 2016. Two further teams joined the ranks of FBS independents for the 2018 season: New Mexico State, whose membership in the Sun Belt Conference was not extended beyond the 2017 season, and Liberty, which transitioned from the Big South Conference of the Football Championship Subdivision in 2018. The UConn Huskies became an FBS independent team.

The next confirmed change to the independent ranks will come in 2023 when BYU joins the Big 12 Conference, and Liberty and New Mexico State join Conference USA.

FBS independents

Reasons for independence
In recent years, most independent FBS schools have joined a conference for two primary reasons: a guaranteed share of television and bowl revenues, and ease of scheduling. Army has a unique circumstance that allows for freedom from conference affiliation.

Army
One of the remaining independent programs is the service academy Army. Whereas television and bowl appearances are important sources of revenue and advertising for most other universities and their football games, the United States federal government fully funds essential scholastic operations of the service academies (athletics are funded by non-profit associations), effectively rendering such income superfluous.

Army has annual games guaranteed with Navy and with Air Force. It also has a historic rivalry with Notre Dame; the rivalry game is semi-regular, though no new editions to this rivalry are currently scheduled. Television rights for the longstanding Army–Navy Game, which is traditionally the final regular season game in the NCAA, serve as a significant revenue source for the program. The academy also uses its football program to recruit future cadets, regardless of whether they ever play a varsity sport; without a conference schedule, the service academy is able to more easily schedule games around the country.

Navy was formerly an independent program, but joined the American Athletic Conference (AAC) for college football in 2015, citing that it wanted to maintain competitiveness, had concerns about scheduling and wanted to take advantage of the opportunity to make more money. Navy's arrival in The American also brought the league's football membership to 12 schools, allowing it to play a conference championship game under the rules in effect at the time. Army and Navy are members of the Patriot League for the bulk of their other sports, most notably men's and women's basketball.

Notre Dame
Notre Dame unsuccessfully attempted on three occasions to join an athletic conference in the early 20th century, including the Big Ten in 1926, but was turned down, reportedly due to anti-Catholicism. Notre Dame is now one of the most prominent programs in the country. Because of its national popularity built over several decades, Notre Dame was the only independent program to be part of the Bowl Championship Series coalition and its guaranteed payout. These factors help make Notre Dame one of the most financially valuable football programs in the country, thus negating the need for Notre Dame to secure revenue by joining a conference.

Previously, Notre Dame had filled its annual schedule without needing conference games to do so. It had longstanding rivalries with many different programs around the country, many under long-term contracts, including annual rivalry games with USC, Navy, Michigan, Stanford, Michigan State, Boston College, Purdue, and Pitt. All Notre Dame home games and most away games are on national television, so other teams have a large financial incentive to schedule the university. Nonetheless, Notre Dame joined the ACC in 2013 for all sports except football and men's ice hockey (the only other ACC member with a men's ice hockey varsity team is Boston College, which played alongside Notre Dame in Hockey East until 2017, when Notre Dame switched to the Big Ten). As part of this agreement, Notre Dame plays five of its football games each season against ACC members. This arrangement required Notre Dame to eliminate or reduce the frequency of several rivalries: the Michigan, Michigan State, and Purdue series were canceled, while Boston College and Pitt, ACC members themselves, now play Notre Dame every three or four years. On the other hand, the move has allowed Notre Dame to resume old rivalries with ACC members Georgia Tech and Miami, while still scheduling Big Ten opponents from time to time.

In 2020, after several non-ACC games were canceled due to the COVID-19 pandemic, Notre Dame opted to play a full ACC football schedule for just the 2020 season. The Irish were eligible for the conference championship game (which they lost to Clemson) and the conference's automatic bowl bids. Notre Dame's football program returned to independence in 2021, with its schedule including the usual five games against ACC schools.

UConn
The University of Connecticut was a founding member of the original Big East Conference in 1979, but that conference split along football lines in 2013. As noted previously, Notre Dame remained an FBS independent but placed its other sports in the ACC, and Pittsburgh and Syracuse followed Notre Dame into the ACC, also joining ACC football. The seven members without FBS football teams left to form a new non-football Big East Conference, while the remaining FBS schools (among them UConn) joined with several new members to reorganize the Big East corporate entity as the American Athletic Conference (which would lose Louisville to the ACC and Rutgers to the Big Ten a year later).

In the years after the split, UConn's flagship men's and women's basketball programs faced significant issues. Jim Calhoun, the coach who had largely built the UConn men into a national powerhouse, had retired after the 2011–12 season. While his successor Kevin Ollie had led the Huskies to a national title in the first season after the split, the team faded noticeably in later seasons, and Ollie was fired after the 2017–18 season amid an NCAA investigation. Ollie's final season saw UConn men's attendance reach its lowest level in 30 years. The women had a somewhat different issue, namely a severe lack of competition in The American. In their seven seasons in that league, the Huskies went unbeaten in conference play, both in the regular season and the conference tournament, with all but two of their 139 conference wins being by double-digit margins.

The Huskies received and accepted an invitation to join the reconfigured Big East in 2019, with a July 2020 entry date. Due to the Big East not sponsoring football, UConn was willing to stay in The American as a football-only member. After leaving the conference in all other sports, the American Athletic Conference was unwilling to allow UConn to remain as a football-only member, leading to UConn's independence in football beginning in 2020. Ironically, the football program's poor record in recent seasons may make it easier to find FBS opponents to fill out the schedule.

UConn opted not to field a team in 2020 due to the COVID-19 pandemic and the resulting disruption to college football schedules. Specifically, as many other programs moved to conference-only schedules due to the pandemic, several of UConn's scheduled matches were canceled, and the program's status as an independent made it very difficult to schedule replacement games.

UMass
The University of Massachusetts Amherst football program played in the Football Championship Subdivision of NCAA Division I before 2011, including a national championship season in 1998.  The Minutemen began a two-year Football Bowl Subdivision transition period in 2011, with the support of the Mid-American Conference playing in their conference as a football-only member. In March 2014, the MAC and UMass announced an agreement for the Minutemen to leave the conference after the 2015 season due to declining an offer to become a full member of the conference. In the agreement between the MAC and the university, there was a contractual clause that had UMass playing in the MAC as a football-only member for two more seasons if UMass declined a full membership offer. Massachusetts announced that it would look for a "more suitable conference" for the team. In September 2014, Massachusetts announced that they will be leaving the MAC and would compete as an independent beginning with the 2016 season.

Independent school stadiums

List of current and past independent schools
The following is a complete list of teams which have been Division I-A (FBS) Independents since the formation of Division I-A in 1978. School names reflect those in current use by their athletic programs, which may not reflect names used when those schools were independents.

See also
 List of American collegiate athletic stadiums and arenas
 NCAA Division I FCS independent schools
 NCAA Division I independent schools
 NCAA Division II independent schools
 NCAA Division III independent schools
 NAIA independent schools

Notes

References

External links
 

 
1978 establishments in the United States
NCAA conferences
Sports organizations established in 1978